The Nehemiah Royce House, also known as the Washington Elm House, is a historic home located at 538 North Main Street in Wallingford, Connecticut. The saltbox house was constructed in 1672. George Washington visited the house twice, first in 1775 while on his way to take command of the Continental Army in Cambridge, Massachusetts, and again in 1789 when he gave an address to the townspeople in front of the house near the Elm.

Biography of Nehemiah Royce
Nehemiah Royce was christened on May 30, 1637 (actual birth date unconfirmed), in New London County, Connecticut, the son of Robert Royce ( – 1676) and Mary Sims.

On November 20, 1660, he married Hannah Morgan (1642–1677). They had nine children together.

Royce, a carpenter, joiner and blacksmith by trade, was one of Wallingford's original 38 proprietors authorized by the Connecticut General Assembly in 1667 to purchase land from the Quinnipiac nation. On May 12, 1670, Wallingford was incorporated and about 126 people settled in the town. On May 11, 1693, Royce was elected deputy representing Wallingford to the Court of the Connecticut Colony.

He died on November 1, 1706, in New Haven, Connecticut and is buried in Center Street Cemetery, Wallingford, Connecticut

Descendants
Nehemiah Royce's descendants number in the thousands today. Some of his notable descendants include:

Jonathan Brace, (1754–1837) was a United States representative from Connecticut. He was born in Harwinton, Connecticut and graduated from Yale College in 1779.
Abbott Lowell Cummings, (1923–2017) was an architectural historian and genealogist, best known for his study of New England architecture.
Clint Eastwood, American film actor, director, and producer
Millard Fillmore, (1800–1874) was the 13th President of the United States, serving from 1850 until 1853 and the last member of the Whig Party (United States) to hold that office.
Oliver Wolcott Gibbs, was an American editor, humorist, theatre critic, playwright and author of short stories, who worked for The New Yorker magazine from 1927 until his death in 1958.
Hamilton Jeffers, (1893–1978) was a noted astronomer.
John Robinson Jeffers, (1887–1962) was an American poet, known for his work about the central California coast. He is considered an icon of the environmental movement.
George B. McClellan, Civil War general, Governor of New Jersey, Democratic opponent of Abraham Lincoln in the 1864 United States presidential election.
Frederick Law Olmsted (1822–1903) was an American journalist, landscape designer and father of American landscape architecture, famous for designing many well-known urban parks, including Central Park in New York City.

House 
The Royce house is an example of American colonial saltbox architectural style. The Royce family occupied the house for over 200 years. The house was moved to its current location in 1924.

The prominent figures associated with the 1930s-1940s rehabilitation of the Royce House is an impressive roster of leaders in the historic preservation movement 
in New England. The list includes Richard Henry Dana, William Sumner Appleton, Elmer Keith, J. Frederick Kelly, George Dudley Seymour, and Bertram Little.  For a time it was a museum and then was used as a residence by Choate Rosemary Hall, until the school donated the house to the Wallingford Historic Preservation Trust in 1999. It is listed in the National Register of Historic Places.

See also

List of the oldest buildings in Connecticut
National Register of Historic Places listings in New Haven County, Connecticut

Notes

References
Jones, Emma C. Brewster. The Brewster Genealogy, 1566-1907: a Record of the Descendants of William Brewster of the "Mayflower," ruling elder of the Pilgrim church which founded Plymouth Colony in 1620. New York: Grafton Press. 1908

External links
Wallingford Historic Preservation Trust: Nehemiah Royce House
Nehemiah Royce House
Royce Family Association
Historic New England

Buildings and structures in Wallingford, Connecticut
Houses completed in 1672
Houses on the National Register of Historic Places in Connecticut
Saltbox architecture in Connecticut
Houses in New Haven County, Connecticut
National Register of Historic Places in New Haven, Connecticut
1670 establishments in Connecticut